The Weems String Band were an old-time country string band who recorded in the 1920s.

The band was made up of the Weems family based in Perry County, Tennessee, including brothers Frank and Dick on fiddle, Jesse on cello and brother-in-law Alvin Conder on banjo and vocals augmented at times with two younger members, Atlas "Dodge" Conder, and Ray Hinson, who is Dick Weems step-son, on guitar and banjo. The only known photo of the band is as a sextet, although they recorded as a quartet without the younger members.

They recorded one single for Columbia Records in 1928. The songs were versions of the standards "Greenback Dollar" and "Davy". Reportedly they had originally planned to record instrumentals but were told to go home and return to the studio the next day with lyrics.

Although their recorded output was tiny the Weems Stringband are noted for their use of fingering positions taken from classical violin training as well as their use of a cello. In spite of such apparent formal training their sole record is quite simple and repetitive in approach with a driving rhythmic if elegant sound. This dichotomy has made their record highly collectable.

Little is known of the lives of the Weems family. After recording their one single they disappear from the historical record, although Alvin Conder is known to have performed as a band member at the Grand Ole Opry in the 1930s.

Artist R. Crumb chose the Weems band as one of those for a series of trading cards in 1980 for Yazoo Records, later compiled in book form.

References
Heroes Of Country Music, R.Crumb, Yazoo 1980

External links
 http://www.allmusic.com/artist/weems-string-band-mn0000243362/biography (Allmusic bio by Eugene Chadborne)
 http://www.banjohangout.org/archive/124170
 http://www.threeperfectminutes.com/2009/03/new-old-time-1928.html

American folk musical groups
Country music groups from Tennessee
Old-time bands
Family musical groups
Perry County, Tennessee
Columbia Records artists